Telmisartan, sold under the brand name Micardis among others, is a medication used to treat high blood pressure, heart failure, and diabetic kidney disease. It is a reasonable initial treatment for high blood pressure. It is taken by mouth.  Versions are available as the combination telmisartan/hydrochlorothiazide, telmisartan/cilnidipine and telmisartan/amlodipine.

Common side effects include upper respiratory tract infections, diarrhea, and back pain. Serious side effects may include kidney problems, low blood pressure, and angioedema. Use in pregnancy may harm the baby and use when breastfeeding is not recommended. It is an angiotensin II receptor antagonist and works by blocking the effects of angiotensin II.

Telmisartan was patented in 1991 and came into medical use in 1999. It is available as a generic medication. In 2020, it was the 248th most commonly prescribed medication in the United States, with more than 1million prescriptions.

Medical uses
Telmisartan is used to treat high blood pressure, heart failure, and diabetic kidney disease. It is a reasonable initial treatment for high blood pressure.

Contraindications
Telmisartan is contraindicated during pregnancy. Like other drugs affecting the renin–angiotensin system (RAS), telmisartan can cause birth defects, stillbirths, and neonatal deaths. It is not known whether the drug passes into the breast milk. Also it is contraindicated in bilateral renal artery stenosis in which it can cause kidney failure.

Side effects
Side effects are similar to other angiotensin II receptor antagonists and    include tachycardia and bradycardia (fast or slow heartbeat), hypotension (low blood pressure) and edema (swelling of arms, legs, lips, tongue, or throat, the latter leading to breathing problems). Allergic reactions may also occur.

Interactions 

Due to its mechanism of action, telmisartan increases blood potassium levels. Combination with potassium preparations or potassium-sparing diuretics could cause hyperkalaemia (excessive potassium levels). Combination with NSAIDs, especially in patients with impaired kidney function, has a risk of causing (usually reversible) kidney failure.

Pharmacology

Mechanism of action
Telmisartan is an angiotensin II receptor blocker that shows high affinity for the angiotensin II receptor type 1 (AT1), with a binding affinity 3000 times greater for AT1 than AT2.

In addition to blocking the renin–angiotensin system, telmisartan acts as a selective modulator of peroxisome proliferator-activated receptor gamma (PPAR-γ), a central regulator of insulin and glucose metabolism. It is believed that telmisartan's dual mode of action may provide protective benefits against the vascular and renal damage caused by diabetes and cardiovascular disease (CVD).

Telmisartan's activity at the peroxisome proliferator-activated receptor delta (PPAR-δ) receptor has prompted speculation around its potential as a sport doping agent as an alternative to GW 501516. Telmisartan activates PPAR-δ receptors in several tissues.

Also, telmisartan has a PPAR-γ agonist activity.

Pharmacokinetics
The substance is quickly but to varying degrees absorbed from the gut. The average bioavailability is about 50% (42–100%). Food intake has no clinically relevant influence on the kinetics of telmisartan. Plasma protein binding is over 99.5%, mainly to albumin and alpha-1-acid glycoprotein. It has the longest half-life of any angiotensin II receptor blocker (ARB) (24 hours) and the largest volume of distribution among ARBs (500 liters). Less than 3% of telmisartan is inactivated by glucuronidation in the liver, and over 97% is eliminated in unchanged form via bile and faeces.

History

Society and culture

Telmisartan is available as a generic medication.

References

Further reading

External links 
 

Angiotensin II receptor antagonists
Benzimidazoles
Benzoic acids
Biphenyls
Boehringer Ingelheim
PPAR agonists
Wikipedia medicine articles ready to translate